The list of ship decommissionings in 1919 includes a chronological list of ships decommissioned in 1919.  In cases where no official decommissioning ceremony was held, the date of withdrawal from service may be used instead.


References

See also 

1919
 Ship decommissionings